KSML may refer to:

 KSML (AM), a radio station (1260 AM) licensed to Diboll, Texas, United States
 KSML-FM, a radio station (101.9 FM) licensed to Huntington, Texas, United States
 Keskisuomalainen, Finnish newspaper
 KSML, the IATA code for Kosher airline meal
 KSML (Apache Kafka) is a framework that allows users to express a Kafka Streams topology as low-code YAML files